Giacomo Parigi (born 18 June 1996) is an Italian footballer who plays as a forward for  club Arzignano.

Career

Arezzo 
Born in Arezzo, Parigi started his career in the team of the city. On 5 August 2012 he made his debut for Arezzo as a substitute replacing Filippo Borgogni in the 62nd minute of a 2–0 away defeat against Pisa in the first round of Coppa Italia. He played also 4 matches in Serie D.

Atalanta 
After a season-long loan to the youth team with an option to buy Parigi joined to Atalanta in January 2013. He played in the youth team for 3 years before to join Cosenza on loan.

Loan to Cosenza 
On 2 February 2016, Parigi was loaned to Serie C side Cosenza on a 6-month loan deal. On 14 February he made his Serie C debut for Cosenza as a substitute replacing Giovanni Cavallaro in the 83rd minute of a 1–1 home draw against Catanzaro. On 28 February he made his second appearances, again as a substitute, replacing Andrea Arrighini in the 87th minute of a 2–1 home win over Juve Stabia. On 2 April, Parigi scored his first professional goal, as a substitute, in the 94th minute of a 3–2 away win over Monopoli. On 30 April he played his fourth match as a substitute replacing Andrea La Mantia in the 71st minute of a 3–3 away draw against Fidelis Andria. Parigi ended his loan to Cosenza with 4 appearances, all as a substitute, and 1 goal.

Loan to Forlì 
On 1 July 2016, Parigi was signed by Serie C side Forlì on a season-long loan deal. On 27 August he made his Serie C debut as a substitute replacing Federico Baschirotto in the 76th minute of a 1–0 away defeat against Venezia. On 1 October, Parigi played his first entire match for Forlì, a 5–0 away defeat against FeralpiSalò. After loss 3–1 on aggregate the play-out matches against Fano, Forli was relegated in Serie D, but Parigi was an unused substitute both times. He ended his season-long loan to Forlì with 20 appearances, only 4 as a starter.

Loan to Akragas and Virtus Francavilla 
On 27 July 2017, Parigi was signed by Serie C club Akragas on a season-long loan deal. On 26 August he made his Serie C debut in a 1–0 away defeat against Matera, he was replaced by Alessio Leveque. On 3 October, Parigi played his first entire match for Akragas, a 3–1 away defeat against Catanzaro. On 7 October he scored his first goal for Akragas in the 39th minute of a 2–2 home draw against Bisceglie. On 25 November he was sent off with a red card in the 30th minute of a 2–0 away defeat against Catania. On 21 January he scored his second goal in the 47th minute of a 3–2 home defeat against Monopoli. In January 2018, Parigi was re-called to Atalanta leaving Akragas with 18 appearances, 2 goals and 1 assist.

On 26 January 2018, Parigi was loaned to Serie C club Virtus Francavilla on a 6-month loan deal. On 29 January he made his Serie C debut for Catania as a substitute replacing Giuseppe Madonia in the 62nd minute of a 1–0 away defeat against Catania. On 4 February, Parigi played his first match as a starter for Virtus Francavilla, a 0–0 home draw against Rende, he was replaced by Giuseppe Madonia in the 69th minute. Parigi ended his loan to Virtus Francavilla with 11 appearances, only 4 as a starter and 2 assists.

Loan to Paganese 
On 6 August 2018, Parigi was signed by Serie C side Paganese on a season-long loan deal. On 16 September he made his Serie C debut for Paganese in a 4–1 home defeat against Rende, he was replaced by Thomas Alberti after 64 minutes. Two weeks later, on 30 September, he scored his first goal for Paganese, as a substitute, in the 93rd minute of a 3–1 home defeat against Juve Stabia. On 20 October he scored his second goal in the 38th minute of a 4–2 home defeat against Catania.

Olbia
On 22 July 2019, he signed a 3-year contract with Olbia.

Vibonese
On 11 September 2020 he joined Vibonese.

Campobasso
On 4 August 2021, Parigi joined to Campobasso.

Loan to Picerno
On 31 January 2022. he joined to Picerno on loan.

Arzignano 
On 11 July 2022, he moved to Arzignano.

Career statistics

Club

References

External links
 

1996 births
Living people
Sportspeople from Arezzo
Footballers from Tuscany
Italian footballers
Association football forwards
Serie C players
Serie D players
S.S. Arezzo players
Atalanta B.C. players
Cosenza Calcio players
Forlì F.C. players
S.S. Akragas Città dei Templi players
Virtus Francavilla Calcio players
Paganese Calcio 1926 players
Olbia Calcio 1905 players
U.S. Vibonese Calcio players
S.S.D. Città di Campobasso players
AZ Picerno players
F.C. Arzignano Valchiampo players